The 1989 New York Mets season was the 28th regular season for the Mets. They went 87–75 and finished 2nd in the NL East. They did not make the postseason for the first time since 1987. They were managed by Davey Johnson. They played home games at Shea Stadium.

Offseason
 December 11, 1988: José Martínez was signed as an amateur free agent by the Mets.
 February 20, 1989: Don Aase was signed as a free agent by the Mets.
 March 2, 1989: Darryl Strawberry threw a punch at Keith Hernandez during team picture day. The two shouted at each other and were restrained by teammates until Strawberry left the area.
 March 30, 1989: Mike Maksudian was released by the Mets.

Regular season

Season standings

Record vs. opponents

Opening Day starters
Gary Carter
Kevin Elster
Dwight Gooden
Keith Hernandez
Gregg Jefferies
Howard Johnson
Kevin McReynolds
Darryl Strawberry
Mookie Wilson

Notable transactions
 June 9, 1989: Lou Thornton was signed as a free agent by the Mets.
 June 18, 1989: Lenny Dykstra, Roger McDowell and a player to be named later were traded by the Mets to the Philadelphia Phillies for Juan Samuel. The Mets completed the deal by sending Tom Edens to the Phillies on July 27.
 July 31, 1989: Mookie Wilson was traded by the Mets to the Toronto Blue Jays in exchange for Jeff Musselman and Mike Brady (minors).
 July 31, 1989: Rick Aguilera, David West, Kevin Tapani, Tim Drummond and a player to be named later were traded by the Mets to the Minnesota Twins for Frank Viola. The Mets completed the deal by sending Jack Savage to the Twins on October 16.

Roster

Game log

Regular season

|-

|-

|-

|- style="background:#bbcaff;"
| – || July 11 || ||colspan=10 |1989 Major League Baseball All-Star Game at Anaheim Stadium in Anaheim
|-

|-

|-

|-

|- style="text-align:center;"
| Legend:       = Win       = Loss       = PostponementBold = Mets team member

Player stats

Batting

Starters by position
Note: Pos = Position; G = Games played; AB = At bats; H = Hits; Avg. = Batting average; HR = Home runs; RBI = Runs batted in

Other batters
Note: G = Games played; AB = At bats; H = Hits; Avg. = Batting average; HR = Home runs; RBI = Runs batted in

Pitching

Starting pitchers
Note: G = Games pitched; IP = Innings pitched; W = Wins; L = Losses; ERA = Earned run average; SO = Strikeouts

Other pitchers
Note: G = Games pitched; IP = Innings pitched; W = Wins; L = Losses; ERA = Earned run average; SO = Strikeouts

Relief pitchers
Note: G = Games pitched; W = Wins; L = Losses; SV = Saves; ERA = Earned run average; SO = Strikeouts

Awards and honors
 Gary Carter, Catcher, Roberto Clemente Award

Farm system

References

External links
1989 New York Mets at Baseball Almanac
1989 New York Mets at Baseball Reference
1989 New York Mets schedule and stats at MLB.com
The 1989 New York Mets at Retrosheet

New York Mets seasons
New York Mets season
New York
1980s in Queens